The Rubiton Stakes is a Melbourne Racing Club Group 2 Thoroughbred horse race held under set weights with penalties conditions, for horses aged three years old and upwards, over a distance of 1100 metres at Caulfield Racecourse, Melbourne, Australia in February. Total prizemoney is A$300,000.

History

The race is named after the outstanding sire and 1987 Cox Plate winner Rubiton.

Grade
1989–1991 - Listed race
1992–2012 - Group 3 race
2013 onwards - Group 2

Distance
1989–1996 – 1000 metres
1997–2005 – 1100 metres
2006  – 1000 metres
2007 onwards  -  1100 metres

Venue
1989–1993 - Sandown Racecourse
1994–1995 - Caulfield Racecourse 
1996 - Sandown Racecourse
1997–2005 - Caulfield Racecourse 
2006 - Sandown Racecourse
2007–2022 - Caulfield Racecourse
2023 - Sandown Racecourse

Conditions
1989–2009 - Weight for Age
2010 - set weights with penalties

Winners

 2022 - Marine One 
 2021 - Prophet's Thumb 
 2020 - Anaheed 
 2019 - Nature Strip
 2018 - Super Cash
 2017 - Super Cash
 2016 - Heatherly
 2015 - Chautauqua
2014 - Lankan Rupee
2013 - Adebisi
2012 - Eagle Falls
2011 - Catapulted
2010 - Here De Angels
2009 - Mind Your Head
2008 - Here De Angels
2007 - Dance The Waves
2006 - Bomber Bill
2005 - Super Elegant
2004 - Super Elegant
2003 - Super Elegant
2002 - Intelligent Star
2001 - †Appoint / Cullen
2000 - Miss Pennymoney
1999 - Flavour
1998 - Al Mansour
1997 - Spartacus
1996 - Stalk
1995 - Schillaci
1994 - Alannon
1993 - Schillaci
1992 - Mavournae
1991 - Redelva
1990 - Kingston Heritage
1989 - Zeditave

† Dead heat

See also
 List of Australian Group races
 Group races

References

Horse races in Australia
Open sprint category horse races